Kirk Goldsberry (born 1977) is a basketball writer. He was the vice president for strategic research for the San Antonio Spurs, the lead analyst for Team USA Basketball, and a visiting researcher at the Harvard Institute of Quantitative Social Sciences. He is best known for his sports writing and for pioneering the hexagonal shot chart in basketball analytics, and for being one of the leaders of the recent advanced metrics movement in basketball.

Education 
Goldsberry earned a Ph.D. (2007) from UC-Santa Barbara where he studied Cartography and data visualization.  He also holds a master's degree from UCSB, and a bachelor's degree from Penn State (1999), where he majored in Earth Science and Geography. He played basketball recreationally.

Career

Academia
Following graduate school, Goldsberry served as an assistant professor of Geography at Michigan State (2007-2013) and a visiting professor at Harvard (2011-2013). At Harvard, Goldsberry designed and co-taught the first Geography course offered since Harvard eliminated Geography in the 1940s. In 2012, Goldsberry presented his first basketball research at MIT Sloan Sports Analytics Conference, which focused on the need for new “spatial and visual analytics” in basketball. Within the paper, Goldsberry introduced a new method for making shot charts using NBA shooting data.

He is currently teaching Sports Analytics within the McCombs School of Business at the University of Texas at Austin.

ESPN and Grantland 
During his time at ESPN and Grantland (2012-2015), Goldsberry achieved prominence by integrating his shot charts with analytical breakdowns of NBA players. His work appeared regularly at Grantland, FiveThirtyEight, and other ESPN outlets. Among his most cited pieces are The Kobe Assist, The Evolution of King James, and DataBall.

Goldsberry leveraged his background as a cartographer to analyze and present spatial basketball data to readers in novel ways. He used his personal experience playing basketball, where his strengths and weaknesses varied depending on his location on the court, and figured that it also applied to other players.

San Antonio Spurs 
After Grantland was shut down, Goldsberry joined the San Antonio Spurs as their vice president for strategic research in 2016. He left in 2018 to return to writing.

Return to writing
In 2019, Goldsberry published SprawlBall: A Visual Tour of the New Era of the NBA, which focuses on the inefficiency of shots in basketball taken between the restricted circle and the three-point line.

Publications

References

1977 births
Living people
Sports scientists
Pennsylvania State University alumni
University of California, Santa Barbara alumni